Giancarlo Bartolini Salimbeni (1916–2000) was an Italian film art director and costume designer.

Selected filmography
 The Mistress of Treves (1952)
 Milady and the Musketeers (1952)
 Son of the Hunchback (1952)
 The Merchant of Venice (1953)
 The Lovers of Manon Lescout (1954)
 The King's Prisoner (1954)
 The Angel of the Alps (1957)
 Pirates of the Coast (1960)
 Kerim, Son of the Sheik (1962)
 Sandokan Against the Leopard of Sarawak (1964)
 Mutiny at Fort Sharpe (1966)
 The Garden of the Finzi-Continis (1970)
 The Kiss (1974)

References

Bibliography
 James McKay. The Films of Victor Mature. McFarland, 2012.

External links

1916 births
2000 deaths
Film people from Florence
Italian art directors
Italian costume designers